Frédéric Pottecher (1905–2001) was a French actor and screenwriter.

1905 births
2001 deaths
20th-century French non-fiction writers
French male screenwriters
20th-century French screenwriters
Officiers of the Légion d'honneur
French male film actors
French male television actors
20th-century French male writers